A referendum on remaining in the Comoros was held in Mayotte on 8 February 1976. The proposal was rejected by 99.42% of voters.

Background
The French National Assembly passed a law on 31 December 1975 allowing for the independence of the Comoros without Mayotte. A referendum was subsequently organised in Mayotte for February 1976 to determine whether residents of the territory wished to remain part of the Comoros or stay under French control.

France vetoed a United Nations Security Council proposal to call off the referendum. Five nonaligned states had proposed that the Security Council call for the cancellation of the referendum.

Results

References

Mahoran Comoros referendum
1976
Referendum
Mahoran Comoros referendum, 1976
Mahoran Comoros referendum